Segesterone, also known as 17α-hydroxy-16-methylene-19-norprogesterone or as 17α-deacetylnestorone, is a steroidal progestin of the 19-norprogesterone group that was never marketed. An acetate ester, segesterone acetate, better known as nestorone or elcometrine, is marketed for clinical use. Segesterone acetate produces segesterone as a metabolite.

References

Tertiary alcohols
Ketones
Norpregnanes
Progestogens
Vinylidene compounds